Kyle Dunkley (born 20 June 2000) is an Australian rules footballer who played for the Melbourne Football Club in the Australian Football League (AFL). He was selected in the 2019 Mid-season rookie draft. He made his senior debut against Carlton in round 16 of the 2019 season. He was delisted at the end of the 2020 season. Dunkley will play the 2021 VFL Season with the Essendon Football Club.

Dunkley is the son of Andrew Dunkley and younger brother of Josh and Lara Dunkley.

He was added to the Sydney Swans top-up list in early 2022

Statistics
 Statistics are correct to the end of the 2019 season

|- style="background-color: #EAEAEA"
! scope="row" style="text-align:center" | 2019
|
| 48 || 5 || 3 || 0 || 34 || 14 || 48 || 22 || 10 || 0.6 || 0.0 || 6.8 || 2.8 || 9.6 || 4.4 || 2.0 || 0
|- class="sortbottom"
! colspan=3| Career
! 5
! 3
! 0
! 34
! 14
! 48
! 22
! 10
! 0.6
! 0.0
! 6.8
! 2.8
! 9.6
! 4.4
! 2.0
! 0
|}

References

External links

Kyle Dunkley from AFL Tables

Melbourne Football Club players
2000 births
Living people
Australian rules footballers from Victoria (Australia)